Neonemobius eurynotus is a species of cricket in the subfamily Nemobiinae. It is native to California, where it can be found in the San Francisco Bay Area. Its common names include Bay Area ground cricket and California ground cricket.

References

Fauna of California
Ground crickets
Taxonomy articles created by Polbot
Insects described in 1918